Alexander Antony Pattison (born 6 September 1997) is an English professional footballer who plays as an attacking midfielder for League Two club Harrogate Town. He has previously played in the English Football League for Yeovil Town and Wycombe Wanderers.

Career

Middlesbrough
Pattison was born in Darlington, County Durham, and joined Middlesbrough's academy at the age of nine. He established himself as a regular in the under-18 and under-23 teams before training with the first team and taking part in their pre-season preparations in 2016. He played in two of the under-23s' three matches in the 2016–17 EFL Trophy as they were eliminated in the group stage.

Pattison joined National League North club York City on 12 December 2017 on a one-month youth loan. After joining, he stated that he hoped his performances at York would help him secure a transfer to an English Football League (EFL) club in the January transfer window. Pattison made his debut on 16 December when starting in a 2–1 defeat away to Kidderminster Harriers in the FA Trophy. He was named as The Press Player of the Month for December, despite having made only two league appearances for York by that time. Pattison returned to Middlesbrough upon the expiration of the loan, having made five appearances for York in all competitions.

He returned to York on 8 February 2018 on loan for the rest of the 2017–18 season, having been unable to find a move to a club in the EFL. He made his second debut two days later when starting York's 1–0 home win over Salford City, with manager Martin Gray complimenting his performance and stating that "he's come back at the right time to strengthen us". He started regularly for York before a hamstring injury sustained on 14 April during a 1–0 defeat away to Gainsborough Trinity saw him miss the rest of the season. He finished his second loan at York with eight appearances, with the team finishing in 11th place in the National League North.

Pattison joined League Two club Yeovil Town on 3 August 2018 on loan for the 2018–19 season. He made his debut on 11 August as a 56th-minute substitute in a 2–2 draw at home to Mansfield Town. He was released by Middlesbrough at the end of the 2018–19 season.

Wycombe Wanderers
Pattison signed for League One club Wycombe Wanderers on 9 July 2019 on a one-year contract. Pattison made his debut for the club on the opening day of the season as Wycombe won 2–0 against Bolton Wanderers and would go on to make another 16 league appearances before the season was prematurely ended due to the COVID-19 pandemic, Wycombe moving into the play-off places as the table was decided on a points-per-game basis. Pattison came off of the bench in both legs of the 6–3 semi final aggregate victory over Fleetwood Town before coming on as a substitute at half-time in the final as Wycombe beat Oxford United to win promotion to the second tier for the first time in their history.

In his first season, Pattison triggered an appearance-based extension in his contract that saw him stay at the club for a second season.

Harrogate Town
On 26 May 2021, Pattison joined Harrogate Town after two seasons at Wycombe.

Career statistics

Honours
Wycombe Wanderers
EFL League One play-offs: 2020

References

External links
Profile  at the Wycombe Wanderers F.C. website

1997 births
Living people
Footballers from Darlington
English footballers
Association football midfielders
Middlesbrough F.C. players
York City F.C. players
Yeovil Town F.C. players
Wycombe Wanderers F.C. players
Harrogate Town A.F.C. players
National League (English football) players
English Football League players